Rangayyanadurga Four–horned antelope Wildlife Sanctuary is a wildlife sanctuary in Karnataka India, aimed for the protection of Four-horned antelopes (Tetracerus quadricornis). The four-horned antelope is classified as Vulnerable species by the International Union for the Conservation of Nature and Natural Resources (IUCN). Established in 2011, it is the only four-horned antelope sanctuary in Karnataka.

In 2017, Indian government tagged an area of 0.95 to 4.5 km from the boundary of the sanctuary as an eco-sensitive zone (ESZ).

History
As per notification number FEE 240 FWL 2010 Bangalore, dated 10 January 2011, sanctuary was officially established in 2011. It is the first and only four-horned antelope sanctuary in Karnataka.

Description

In 2017, to protect from commercial, industrial and other hazardous activities that cause damage to the ecosystem of the sanctuary, the Indian government tagged an area of 0.95 to 4.5 km from the boundary of the sanctuary as an eco-sensitive zone (ESZ).

Flora and fauna
The four-horned antelope found in the sanctuary is endemic to India, and is classified as Vulnerable species by the International Union for the Conservation of Nature and Natural Resources (IUCN) in its Red List. It is protected under the Schedule 1 of the Wildlife (Protection) Act 1972 (53 of 1972) by Government of India. The Rangayyanadurga  Sanctuary is rich in biodiversity.  Other than unique antelope species endemic to India, mammals seen here include sloth bear, pangolin, jungle cat, porcupine and hyena. Reptiles seen in the sanctuary include krait, viper and king cobra. It is also home to many butterfly species, bees, birds, bats and spiders. The bird White-naped tit seen here is also classified as vulnerable in IUCN Red List.

Threats and precautionary measures
Poaching, habitat loss and fragmentation are the major threats affecting the sanctuary. In 2012 August, hunters killed a pregnant four-horned antelope. It is said that the number of four-horned antelope, which was only 50 ten years ago, increased to 200 in 2022.

References

Wildlife sanctuaries in Karnataka
Wildlife sanctuaries of the Western Ghats
Protected areas of Karnataka
2011 establishments in Karnataka
Protected areas established in 2011